This page shows the results of the basketball tournament at the 2003 Pan American Games, held in the Palacio de los Deportes Virgilio Travieso Soto in Santo Domingo, Dominican Republic from August 2 to August 8, 2003.

Men's tournament

Preliminary round

Group A

August 2, 2003

August 3, 2003

August 4, 2003

Group B

August 2, 2003

August 3, 2003

August 4, 2003

Knockout stages

Final standings

Awards

Team Rosters

 ARGENTINA
 Román González
 Bruno Labaque
 Patricio Prato
 Martin Leiva
 Paolo Quinteros
 Julio Mazzaro
 Pablo Prigioni
 Matías Pelletieri
 Diego Alba
 Diego Guaita
 Diego Cavaco
 Matías Sandes

Head coach:
 Fernando Duró

 BRAZIL
 Marcelinho Machado
 Arnaldinho Filho
 Dede Barbosa
 Valtinho Silva
 Murilo da Rosa
 Demétrius Ferraciu
 Alex Garcia
 Anderson Varejão
 Guilherme Giovannoni
 Tiago Splitter
 André Pereira
 Renato Pinto

Head coach:
 Lula Ferreira

 CANADA
 Randy Nohr
 Rowan Barrett
 Prosper Karangwa
 Greg Newton
 Shawn Swords
 Novell Thomas
 Jesse Young
 Peter Guarasci
 Greg Francis
 Andy Kwiatkowski
 Juan Mendez
 Mike King

Head coach:
 Jay Triano

 DOMINICAN REPUBLIC
 José Vargas
 Franklin Western
 Carlos Payano
 Carlos Paniagua
 Otto Ramírez
 Miguel Angel Pichardo
 Amaury Filion
 Luis Flores
 Jack Michael Martínez
 Carlos Morban
 Jeffrey Greer
 Francisco García

Head coach:
 Héctor Báez

 MEXICO
 Anthony Norwood
 Adam Parada
 David Meza
 Horacio Llamas
 Omar López
 Ramsés Benítez
 Víctor Mariscal
 Omar Quintero
 Víctor Ávila
 Enrique Zúñiga
 Jorge Rochín
 David Crouse

Head coach:
 Guillermo Vecchio

 PUERTO RICO
 Rick Apodaca
 Carlos Arroyo
 Larry Ayuso
 Sharif Fajardo
 Bobby Joe Hatton
 Antonio Latimer
 Jorge Rivera
 Daniel Santiago
 Orlando Santiago
 Alejandro Carmona
 Peter John Ramos
 Richie Dalmau

Head coach:
 Julio Toro

 UNITED STATES
 Rickey Paulding
 Chris Hill
 Ben Gordon
 Andre Barrett
 Blake Stepp
 Luke Jackson
 Chuck Hayes
 Brandon Mouton
 Arthur Johnson
 Emeka Okafor
 Ike Diogu
 Josh Childress

Head coach:
 Tom Izzo

 URUGUAY
 Alejandro Pérez
 Sebastián Leguizamón
 Gastón Páez
 Nicolás Mazzarino
 Alejandro Muro
 Emiliano Taboada
 Mauricio Aguiar
 Trelonnie Owens
 Leandro García Morales
 Gustavo Szczygielski
 Luis Silveira
 Esteban Batista

Head coach:
 Néstor García

Women's tournament

Preliminary round Robin

August 2, 2003

August 3, 2003

August 4, 2003

August 5, 2003

August 6, 2003

Play-offs

Final standings

Awards

Team Rosters

 CANADA
 Cal Bouchard
 Claudia Brassard
 Leighann Doan
 Carolyn Ganes
 Isabelle Grenier
 Michelle Hendry
 Nikki Johnson
 Teresa Kliendienst
 Susan Murray
 Dianne Norman
 Kim Smith
 Shona Thorburn

Head coach:
 Allison McNeill

 UNITED STATES
 Jenni Benningfield
 Rebekkah Brunson
 Jamie Carey
 Roneeka Hodges
 Laurie Koehn
 Janel McCarville
 Loree Moore
 Nicole Powell
 Ann Strother
 Lindsay Taylor
 Iciss Tillis
 Barbara Turner

Head coach:
 Debbie Ryan

 BRAZIL
 Adriana Moisés
 Alessandra Santos de Oliveira
 Cíntia Santos
 Jacqueline Godoy
 Jucimara Dantas
 Kelly Santos
 Lilian Gonçalves
 Micaela Jacintho
 Renata Oliveira
 Silvinha Luz
 Soeli Zakrzeski
 Vivian Lopes

Head coach:
 Antonio Carlos Barbosa

References
 Men's Results
 Women's Results
 LatinBasket

Basketball
2003
2003–04 in North American basketball
2003–04 in South American basketball
International basketball competitions hosted by the Dominican Republic